Alopoglossus festae is a species of lizard in the family Alopoglossidae. The species is native to northwestern South America.

Etymology
The specific name, festae, is in honor of Italian zoologist Enrico Festa.

Geographic range
A. festae is found in southwestern Colombia and adjacent northwestern Ecuador.

Habitat

Reproduction
A. festae is oviparous.

References

Further reading
Artega A, Pyron RA, Peñafiel N, Romero-Barreto P, Culebras J, Bustamante L, Yánez-Muñoz MH, Guayasamin JM (2016). "Comparative Phylogeography Reveals Cryptic Diversity and Repeated Patterns of Cladogenesis for Amphibians and Reptiles in Northwestern Ecuador". PLoS ONE 11 (4): e0151746.
Hernández-Morales C, Sturaro MJ, Sales-Nunes P, Lotzkat S, Peloso PLV (2020). "A species-level total evidence phylogeny of the microteiid lizard family Alopoglossidae (Squamata: Gymnophthalmoidea)". Cladistics 36 (3): 301–321.
Peracca MG (1896). "Descrizione di un nuovo genere e di una nuova specie di Teiidae raccolta nel Darien dal dott. E. Festa". Bollettino dei Musei di Zoologia ed Anatomia comparata della Regia Università di Torino 11 (235): 1-4. (Diastemalepis festae, new species, pp. 2–4, Figures 1–5). (in Italian).
Ruibal R (1952). "Revisionary Studies of some South American Teiidae". Bulletin of the Museum of Comparative Zoölogy at Harvard College 106: 475–529. (Alopoglossus festae, pp. 502–505).

Alopoglossus
Reptiles described in 1904
Taxa named by Mario Giacinto Peracca